Elisabeth Reisinger (born 2 August 1996) is an Austrian alpine skier.

Career
In 2019 she won the general classification of the Europa Cup, also winning two rankings of the discipline.

World Cup results
Top 10

Europa Cup results
Reisinger has won an overall Europa Cup and two specialty standings.

FIS Alpine Ski Europa Cup
Overall: 2019
Downhill: 2019
Super-G: 2019

References

External links
 
 

1996 births
Living people
Austrian female alpine skiers